George W. Williams may refer to:

George Washington Williams (1849–1891), U.S. soldier and politician
George Washington Williams (naval officer) (1869–1925), American Navy officer
George W. McWilliams, American Civil War Medal of Honor recipient
George W. Williams, vaudeville performer and recording artist

See also 
George Williams (disambiguation)